Hydrometeorological Institute of Slovenia (HMZ) was the national hydrological and meteorological service of Slovenia. It was founded of 15 April 1947 by the then Socialist Republic of Slovenia.

On the day of establishment to it passed the then hydrological and meteorological stations and institutions on the territory of the Republic of Slovenia, with the exception of stations of the federal (Yugoslavian) interest.

The Hydrometeorological Institute of Slovenia was in 2001 transformed into the Slovenian Environment Agency.

References
The information in this article is based on that in its Slovenian equivalent.

1947 establishments in Slovenia
2001 disestablishments in Slovenia
Environment of Slovenia
Governmental meteorological agencies in Europe
Organizations based in Ljubljana